He-Yin Zhen (c. 1884 – c. 1920) was an early 20th-century Chinese feminist and anarchist.

She was born as He Ban in Yizheng, Jiangsu, but she took the name He Zhen (He "Thunderclap") when she married the noted scholar Liu Shipei in 1903. Despite this, she signed her published writings as He-Yin Zhen (何殷震) to include her mother's maiden name. She published a number of strong attacks in anarchist journals on male social power, arguing that society could not be free without the liberation of women.

Biography
Zhen was born into a prosperous Jiangsu family and given a good education in the Confucian classics, despite being female. She married Liu Shipei in 1903 and moved with him to Shanghai, where she continued her education at the Patriotic Women's School run by Cai Yuanpei.

She and Liu fled from the Manchu government to Tokyo in 1907, where she became a mainstay of a Chinese anarchist group and a major contributor to many journals. She contributed to Tianyi bao (Natural Justice), which published from 1907–1908, as well as to the Paris journal, Xin Shiji (New Century or New Era), edited by the anarchist group led by Li Shizeng and Wu Zhihui. She and her husband both wrote under pen names, and many of her articles were misattributed to Liu.

Zhen also founded the Women's Rights Recovery Association (Nüzi Fuquan Hui), which called for the use of force to end the male oppression of women, as well as resistance to the ruling class and capitalists, while endorsing traditional values such as perseverance and respect for the larger community.

In 1909, after a falling out with the conservative but deeply anti-Manchu people scholar Zhang Taiyan, she and Liu returned to China to work with the Manchu government. After the 1911 Revolution, Liu worked with the new government, and was a faculty member at Peking University.

The end of Zhen's life is still a mystery. Following Liu's death from tuberculosis in 1919, she was rumored to have become a Buddhist nun and ordained under the name Xiao Qi. However, there were also reports that she died of a broken heart or a mental disorder.

Philosophy

Zhen had a different approach to the "Women Question" and women's oppression that were raised in China in the late 19th century. She believed that gender and social class were inseparable, and analyzed the misery Chinese women had endured for millennia from the perspective of labor. Zhen distinguished herself from contemporary feminist thinkers in that she considered anarchy the one condition in which women could be fully liberated. Unlike many of her contemporaries such as Liang Qichao, who viewed the liberation of women as a means to revive China, Zhen made resolving women's oppression her ultimate goal. Zhen's feminism was also formed through her critiques of capitalism, especially its inhumanity. In her opinion, women would never be free if capitalism persisted. This line of critique provided a logical and powerful philosophy against mainstream western feminism of the time, which prioritized women's suffrage as the ultimate liberation of women. Zhen criticized not only the social forms women were subjected to, but also the political and cultural suppression that limited the freedom of women.

Labor Theory
Zhen approached the concept of labor theory from a historical point of view. She argued that throughout history, Chinese women were relegated to closed quarters, like the home, and prohibited from connecting with the outside world. They could not provide for themselves, making them dependent on their husbands and thus, subjected to his power and authority. She argued against male thinkers who denounced women for dependence on their husbands, blaming women for their inferiority to men. Zhen criticized them for hypocrisy. She argued that since women were not allowed to leave their inner quarters, it was unthinkable for them to find a job to support themselves. Although lower-class women were part of the workforce, they were forced into labor because they had to subsidize their family income, thus their labor was not viewed as their own production but something insignificant in a society dominated by men.

One popular proposal to solve the purported problem of women's lack of productivity was to call women into the labor force. However, Zhen saw the flaws in this solution promulgated by male feminists of the time. She pointed out that under capitalism, women were still exploited even if they achieved professional independence, they remained exploited in factories as workers or in offices as secretaries. In workplaces, women had to listen to their bosses and follow their orders, because they were still dependent on their bosses for wages. The capitalist system put women into a system where their work was exploited, thus even if they received their full wages, the wages were still set low for the benefits of the capitalists. Women would never rise up and earn a fair share in a capitalist society. Ultimately, joining the labor force would not liberate women from their shackles, because regardless of their type of work, women's bodies and labor were still exploited.

Zhen thus saw the solution for the "Women Question" as the liberation of the working class. Concerned with the commodification of women's bodies, she emphasized labor as an autonomous and free practice among humans, contrasted with its commodified model in classical and neoclassical political economy. Labor should represent both economical liberation and intellectual liberation, as women became free in their actions. But in a capitalist society, women were commodified as their body and their labor was forced labor for others, over which they had no control. For He-Yin, labor was not only an economic concept, but also had a fundamental impact on human society. She refused the commoditization of labor, and insisted on seeing labor as a ontological concept rather than a mere economic concept. As long as a system of exploitation system monopolized production where women remained commodities dependent on society, so-called "professional independence" also remained "professional enslavement." Thus, to liberate women from their subjugation, Zhen concluded that the capitalist system must be broken and a communal system must be established.

Anarchism
Zhen also argued against any type of established government. In her anarchical writing, her anarchical ideas are evident in her criticism of the parliamentary governments of the west. She did not believe in the women's suffrage movement, although she praised suffragists for their courage. Zhen cited the Norwegian women's suffrage movement as an example, and argued that since only women from a noble background or a wealthy family could become elected in the parliament, how could one ensure that the elected women would not act against their fellow women from the lower-class, and only act in favor of her fellow members of the upper-class?

Zhen believed that electing women into office only added a third tier of suppression for working-class women, in addition to the oppression by men and by the government. For the same reason, she did not believe that leftist parties, such as the Social Democratic Party in the United States, would act in favor of the common people. Once they were in office, the governmental system would lure these leftist parties towards power and authority, and neglecting their fellow suppressed commoners, including working-class women. These leftist parties would diverge from their original goal of liberating the lower class and abolishing capitalism. Zhen concluded that women's liberation could only be achieved through the action of the common people, without the intervention of the government. She provided as an example the working class in the United States who did not benefit even when the Social Democratic Party was elected, Let alone the women, who were barely represented in the party.

Zhen did not agree with the agenda of many leftist parties or how they listed their end goals to be elected. She believed that without the government, men and women from the lower classes could focus on improving their livelihood instead of diverting their attention into other fields that interested the government and the upper classes.

Instead of endorsing participation in a society governed by bourgeois elections, Zhen proposed an ideal communal society in which women and men were equal and shared the same responsibilities and production. Her ideal society would be similar to a socialist or communist country in the 21st century, but without a central government. In this ideal society, children would be brought up in "public child care facilities," therefore freeing women of their motherly duties and leveling the playing field for women do that they could assume responsibility equal to men. Zhen also proposed that if men and women were raised and treated equally, and the responsibility assumed by both genders was equal as well, then the distinction between "men" and "women" would become unnecessary. Hence, neither men nor women would be oppressed by their duties. Zhen attempted to rebuild a system where women could actively participate in society and have real power to decide their future. Her solution to gender inequality and the oppression of women was to liberate women from any form of oppression, including oppression by an established governmental system, regardless of its ideology.

Feminism 
He Zhen’s critique focused on two aspects of Chinese patriarchy at that time. First is directly against traditional Chinese Confucianism, which oppressed women for thousands of years in China’s history. Traditional Chinese Confucianism defines women’s duty and life purpose, which restrain women’s basic human rights like working, attending imperial exams (Keju), studying, and equal domestic status. Other Chinese feminists at that time also upheld similar objections against Confucianism. The second aspect is against the resignification of women in late nineteenth- and early twentieth-century Chinese liberal feminist circles. Although society and most Chinese scholars at that time widely judged and rethought the flaws and backwardness of Confucianism, only women in the urban areas gained more rights to improve their social status and living condition. The resignification of women still did not equalize the power gap between men and women. In He Zhen’s ideals. the true liberation had not been realized yet.

He Zhen’s 1907 article On the Question of Women's Liberation sharply pointed out facts about marriage in China and the western world. She first mentioned that women in the western world have the freedom to divorce, get an education, and stay single. Apparently, women in the western world are free, but she defined such freedom as physical and unreal liberation. She emphasized that Chinese women’s imitation and Chinese feminism that following the western path is wrong. She suggested that “吾决不望女子仅获伪自由、伪平等也，吾尤望女子取获真自由、真平等也” ("I absolutely do not want women to gain only false freedom and equality, I especially hope that women gain true freedom and true equality").

He Yin Zhen believed women’s liberation had to be achieved by women, not granted by men. She wrote that gender equality could not be achieved if women still depended on men for basic needs. She critiqued sex work and women’s promiscuity as a response to gender inequality and oppression. While she understood that liberation could not be achieved immediately, she believed that it could never be achieved without the elimination of the commodification of women’s bodies. She wrote in her 1907 writing "On the Question of Women’s Liberation," “When liberation is mistaken for self-indulgence, a woman cannot think of a nobler task than sexual pleasure, not knowing that she might have fallen into prostitution unwittingly. These are some of the weaknesses of Chinese women.” He Yin Zhen wrote that this promiscuity of Chinese women may be a result of their long-term cloistering in the home.

He Yin Zhen asserts that prostitution is incompatible with liberation. She observed how prostitutes waited on the streets at night for customers like “wild chickens” in the wind and snow. She wrote, "What are the reasons for this? It's because people with money take me and buy me, and I depend on this kind of business for eating." She writes in On the Question of Women's Liberation that women prostitute themselves to gain the favor of wealthier men, thus further enslaving themselves to both the power of men and money. The gratification which results from prostitution is granted by men and perpetuates wealth inequality and the dominance of men, which is why it cannot be a form of liberation. Ultimately, He Yin Zhen was opposed to turning women into "tools for producing wealth".

Influence
Most of Zhen's feminist writings were written when she and her husband resided in Japan, and the influence of her feminism on the early Chinese feminist community is unclear. However, her feminist views were influential in the May Fourth movement, and were especially picked up by female communists. Her influence on the development of anarchism among Chinese scholars was also significant. Anarchism was first documented and introduced to the Chinese international students in Tokyo in the Japanese translations of western anarchical works. Chinese students in Japan adopted it as a solution to contemporary Chinese problems and sought a solution for China after the 1911 Revolution in China. Among the scholars developing their own understandings of anarchism was Zhen. Her works, including articles in her journal, Tianyi bao, influenced the development of anarchism in China. Tianyi bao also published the first translation into Chinese of the Communist Manifesto. Her husband also supported the ideology, despite being closely engaged with the military personages of the warlords in China.

Writings
Her essay On the Question of Women's Liberation, which appeared in Tianyi in 1907, opened by declaring that 

"On The Question Of Women's Labor," published in Tianyi in July 1907, traces the exploitation of women's labor starting from the well field system of ancient China, especially decrying the tragedies of prostitution, female infanticide, and concubinage of recent times. "Economic Revolution And Women's Revolution" "On The Revenge Of Women," asks the women of her country: "has it occurred to you that men are our archenemy?" "On Feminist Antimilitarism," and "The Feminist Manifesto" were also powerful indictments of male social power.

"On Feminist Antimilitarism", originally published in 1907, Zhen addressed the importance of women protesting against militarism. He-Yin used the burst of antimilitarism during the early 20th century in Southern Europe and the example of the revolutions taking place without antimilitarism to propel it foreword. She advocates that since the military are strongly armed, these revolutions are too difficult, as they can be put down by the army. She even said: "If we examine the past we see that troops are good for nothing but rape, kidnapping, looting, and murder" to defend her view that antimilitarism benefited all, since the military was responsible for major atrocities in China. In this essay Zhen quoted a poem by musician Cai Wenji to depict the ongoing carnage faced by women who were captured by the invaders. Often, these women committed suicide. If women were able to escape this fate, they often lost their sons, mourned their husbands and suffered as their household was ruined. Furthermore, the fate of capture was unavoidable for many Chinese and it wasn’t limited in its scope. All women were at risk regardless of their social class or lineage.  Zhen correlated militarism and prostitution, as wives were faced with the loss of their sons and husbands with little compensation. This left them to face the difficulty of providing for themselves, leading them to have to prostitute themselves. Zhen also addressed the tragedies women faced as households were separated and brought together again by loss, particularly using poems to illustrate the sentiments of Chinese writers who had faced these tragedies

Within "The Feminist Manifesto", also published in 1907, Zhen tackled the institution of marriage as a root source of the inequalities between man and woman. She noted that marriage was a symbol of strength for men, as the more wives he possessed, the more respected he was. This encouraged men to marry and have many concubines. Zhen also addressed the inequality between "wife" and "husband". While men could marry many women, women were only ever socially expected to have one husband: "Once a woman becomes a man’s wife, she remains so for life". This developed the idea that women must follow their husbands since they could not be whole without them, and created the illusion that her husband was her heaven. To begin to be liberated and equal to men, women should strive for monogamous marriage. Women should NOT take their husbands’ surnames, and parents should value their sons and daughters equally. Daughters and sons should be raised without discrimination, and if couples were struggling, they should be able to separate. Those who remarried should only marry someone who had previously married. First-time marriages should be limited to people who had not been married. She wanted to abolish all brothels and relieve prostitutes.

Zhen then addressed objections that might be made to her proposals:
 Since women give birth, they are by nature different than men in their labor and capabilities. Zhen responded that she was not limiting herself to a women’s revolution, but instead a complete social revolution. As a result, public child care facilities would raise the child after its birth. 
 There are more women than men, so it cannot be expected that everyone would have only one spouse. Zhen responded that women did not go to war and since men died in war, the numbers were actually skewed. If her social revolution took place, she said, the numbers would adjust themselves.

Tianyi bao: Anarchist Journal
Tianyi bao, first published in Tokyo, Japan in 1907, is often considered the first anarchist journal in the Chinese language. Zhen partnered with her husband, Chinese anarchist and activist Liu Shipei, to publish the journal. In it, many anarchists, including Zhen herself, published articles challenging early 20th century values. Zhen edited the journal as well. The journal itself was antigovernment and heavily influenced by questions regarding women and their roles in society. Many other topics were addressed that particularly encouraged revolution. Zhen is often considered to have encouraged the radicalism that occurred post-publication, as her writings were interpreted as radicalized. She was also one of the few feminist writers at the time who wrote from a female perspective. During the early 20th century, many of the feminist writers of Chinese society were men, which made Zhen's perspective much more radical, as she advocated reform through complete overturn of government and capitalist systems. Throughout the years however, Zhen published fewer articles in Tianyi bao, but these articles, in addition to her own published essays, are some of the few accounts credibly written on Zhen's behalf. Underneath Zhen's guidance and publication, it was heavily concerned with feminism, but as Zhen began to publish less, the journal soon became more geared to anarchism.

But despite Zhen's attempt to balance anarchism and feminism, the journal soon focused on anarchism. This also demonstrated the overall change in Chinese society, which at first focused on addressing women's roles in society, but soon became more interested in anarchy and government institutions, and preventing Asia from falling into the western Capitalist model.

References

Bibliography

Further reading

External links
 "What Women Should Know About Communism" By He Zhen Asia For Educators, Columbia University.
 The Individual in Early Chinese Anarchism: Feminism and Utopianism in the Tianyi (Natural Justice) Paper presentation ICAS 2005, Shanghai (Ole Fossgård) Not to be quoted

1880s births
1920 deaths
Anarcha-feminists
Chinese expatriates in Japan
Chinese feminists
Chinese anarchists
Chinese anti-capitalists
Chinese essayists
Chinese women essayists
20th-century Chinese writers
20th-century pseudonymous writers
Pseudonymous women writers
Chinese magazine founders
Chinese exiles